Tai Shan may refer to:
 Mount Tai, a mountain in Shandong Province, China
 Tai Shan (giant panda), a giant panda born at the Smithsonian's National Zoo in 2005
 Tai Shan (978), a Chinese military Type 071 amphibious transport dock
 "Tai Shan", a song on the album Hold Your Fire by Rush
 Tai Shan, a 291m tall hill on Lantau Island, in Hong Kong

People with the given name
 Chang Tai-shan, Taiwanese baseball player
 Tai-Shan Schierenberg, British painter

See also
 Taishan (disambiguation)